Zouhair Bouadoud (born 12 July 1986) is a French former professional footballer who played as a forward.

References

External links
 

1986 births
Living people
French sportspeople of Moroccan descent
French footballers
Footballers from Strasbourg
Association football forwards
Le Havre AC players
SV Eintracht Trier 05 players
1. FSV Mainz 05 II players
VfR Aalen players
Wormatia Worms players
SV Elversberg players
Karlsruher SC II players
Sportfreunde Siegen players
3. Liga players
Regionalliga players
French expatriate footballers
French expatriate sportspeople in Germany
Expatriate footballers in Germany
French expatriate sportspeople in Switzerland
Expatriate footballers in Switzerland